The Citronelle Railroad Historic District is a historic district in Citronelle, Alabama, United States. It is roughly bounded by Centre and Main streets from Union to Faye streets. It was placed on the National Register of Historic Places on January 25, 1990.

The Citronelle Walking Trail passes through the district.

References

Historic districts in Mobile County, Alabama
National Register of Historic Places in Mobile County, Alabama
Historic districts on the National Register of Historic Places in Alabama